Fruit beer is beer made with fruit added as an adjunct or flavouring.

Fruit beer is a beer made from malt-scented strawberries, plums, raspberries, and cherries. It's an additive- or flavoring-containing form. Initially manufactured in Belgium, fruit beer is now available worldwide.  

Lambic beers, originating in the Zenne valley in Belgium, may be refermented with cherries to make kriek, or fermented with raspberries to make framboise. 

Flemish old brown beers go through a multiple stage fermentation process. After the first fermentation of the wort, sugar is added and the beer is refermented in wooden casks. Fruit beer can be made from them by using fruit instead of sugar.

See also
Adjuncts#Fruit or vegetable
Kriek lambic 
Framboise
Fruit lambic

References

Types of beer